Valerianella vesicaria is a species of flowering plant in the family Caprifoliaceae, native to the central Mediterranean and western Asia, extinct in Algeria, and introduced in Argentina. A somewhat ruderal species, it is a minor weed of cultivation.

References

vesicaria
Flora of Libya
Flora of Italy
Flora of Sardinia
Flora of Sicily
Flora of Greece
Flora of Crete
Flora of European Turkey
Flora of Western Asia
Flora of Turkmenistan
Plants described in 1768